Aoa, AOA, or AoA may refer to:

Government
 Agreement on Agriculture, a World Trade Organization treaty
 Administration on Aging, a health agency of the United States
 Angolan kwanza, the currency of Angola
 Auxiliary Organizations Association, an organized body related to the California State University system
 Analysis of Alternatives, form of trade study used by the Department of Defense

Science and health
Aoa (genus), a genus of butterflies in the family Pieridae
Age of acquisition, a psycholinguistic term
Alpha Omega Alpha, a medical honor society
American Optometric Association, a health association
American Osteopathic Association, a medical association
Ammonia-oxidizing archaea performing oxidation of ammonia into nitrite (Nitrification)
Angle of arrival, direction from which a radio wave arrives at an antenna array
 Angle of attack, a measure of a body through a fluid
Australian Orthopaedic Association, a not-for-profit organisation

Administration
Analysis of Alternatives, a method of analyzing choices
Articles of association, a document that establishes the basic details of a corporation
 Activity on arrow, the activities on the arrows of the arrow diagramming method in project planning

Aviation
Air operations area, the area of an airport used for landing, takeoff, or surface maneuvering of aircraft
 Airport Operators Association, a trade association for UK airport operators
 American Overseas Airlines, a former transport company
Angle of attack, the angle between the chord line of the wing of a fixed-wing aircraft and the vector representing the relative motion between the aircraft and the atmosphere
Abort once around, a type of Space Shuttle abort mode

Entertainment
 AOA (group), a South Korean girl group debuted in 2012
Act of Aggression, video game
Age of Apocalypse, a comic storyline
Aniplex of America, an anime licensor
Armies of Arcana, a tabletop war game
The Axis of Awesome, an Australian comedy band

Other
 'Aoa, a village in American Samoa
Adam-Ondi-Ahman, a sacred location for the Latter Day Saints
American Outlaws Association, a motorcycle club
Andrews Osborne Academy, a school
As-salamu alaykum, traditional meeting between Muslims, coined in late 90's by M. Shomail Haider

Automated online assistant, a program that attempts to assist users